The discography of American electronic music producer and DJ Illenium consists of four studio albums, three remix albums, four extended plays, thirty-six singles and eight music videos.

Albums

Studio albums

Remix albums

Extended plays

Singles

Other charted songs

Remixes

Music videos

Notes

References 

Discographies of American artists
Electronic music discographies